RC Dragon Brno is a Czech rugby club in Brno. They currently play in the KB Extraliga. They have also been involved in the Central & Eastern European Rugby Cup since its inception in 2008.

History
The club started out as Sokol Brno I, with the name changing to Sokol Zbrojovka Brno in 1951. Following the nationwide restructuring of Physical Education and Sport in 1953, which affected rugby among others, the Sokol Zbrojovka Brno club split in two, Spartak Zbrojovka Brno and Slavia VŠ Brno (now RC Bystrc).

Honours
 Czechoslovak Championships
 1950, 1965
 Czech Cup
 2000
 KB Extraliga
 2000

Historical names

 1946 - 1950 Sokol Brno I
 1951 - 1952 Sokol Zbrojovka Brno
 1953             Spartak Zbrojovka Brno
 1954 - 1968 Spartak ZJŠ Brno
 1969 - 1990 TJ Zbrojovka Brno
 1991 -           RC Dragon Brno

Coaches
 Jiří Náprstek (1946–1948)
 Viktor Šťastný (1949)
 Jiří Náprstek (1950–1951)
 Viktor Šťastný (1952)
 Jiří Náprstek (1953–1955)
 Oldřich Pazdera (1956–1963)
 Ladislav Baloun (1964)
 Viktor Šťastný (1964–1973)
 Vítězslav Smrž (1974)
 Viktor Šťastný (1975–1987)
 Milan Buryánek, Jiří Šťastný (1987–1990)
 Milan Buryánek, Vítězslav Dosedla Sr. (1990–1993)
 Jiří Šťastný, Břetislav Vlk Sr. (1993–2002)
 Jiří Šťastný, Břetislav Vlk Sr., Milan Buryánek (2003–2006)
 Zdenek Zapletal, Karel Trojan (2006)
 Zdenek Zapletal, Břetislav Vlk Jr. (2007)
 Jiří Šťastný, Milan Buryánek (2008-)

External links
  RC Dragon Brno

Czech rugby union teams
Sport in Brno
Rugby clubs established in 1946